Bangladesh being a first line littoral state of the Indian Ocean has a very good source of marine resources in the Bay of Bengal. On the other hand, Bangladesh is a small and developing country overloaded with almost unbearable pressure of human population. In the past, people of Bangladesh were mostly dependent upon land-based proteins. But, the continuous process of industrialisation and urbanisation consumes the limited land area. Now there is no other way than to harvest the vast under water protein from the Bay of Bengal, which can meet the country's demand.

More than 80 percent of the animal protein in the Bangladeshi diet comes from fish. Fish accounted for 6 percent of GDP in the fiscal year of 1970, nearly 50 percent more than modern industrial manufacturing at that time. Most commercial fishermen are low-caste Hindus who eke out the barest subsistence working under primitive and dangerous conditions. They bring a high degree of skill and ingenuity to their occupation; a few of the most enterprising ones are aided by domesticated otters, which behave like shepherds, swimming underwater, driving fish toward the fisherman's net (and being rewarded themselves with a share of the catch). Fish for local consumption are generally of freshwater varieties.

Shrimp farming
As of the end of 1987, prevailing methods for culturing shrimp in Bangladesh were still relatively unsophisticated, and average yields per hectare were low. In the late 1980s, almost all inland shrimping was done by capture rather than by intensive aquaculture. Farmers relied primarily on wild postlarval and juvenile shrimp as their sources of stock, acquired either by trapping in ponds during tidal water exchange or by gathering from local estuaries and stocking directly in the ponds. Despite the seemingly low level of technology applied to shrimp aquaculture, it became an increasingly important part of the frozen seafood industry in the mid-1980s. The shrimp farming industry in Bangladesh has been handicapped by low-quality and low prices.

The World Bank and the Asian Development Bank financed projects to develop shrimp aquaculture in the 1980s. Much of the emphasis was on construction of modern hatcheries. Private investors were also initiating similar projects to increase capacity and to introduce modern technology that would increase average yields. The Food and Agriculture Organization of the United Nations (FAO) has provided assistance to the shrimp and fishing industry in meeting fish safety and quality control standards based on the Hazard Analysis Critical Control Point (HACCP) approach.

Shrimp in the wild are associated with mangrove. Mangrove estuaries such as those found in the Sundarbans of southwestern Bangladesh are especially rich productive ecosystems and provide the spawning grounds for shrimp and fish. Intensive shrimp farming often involves conversion of mangrove stands to brine ponds where shrimp are grown.

Training and education
Training for the fishing industry of Bangladesh, as well as for merchant shipping and related maritime industries is provided by the Bangladesh Marine Fisheries an Academy.

Labor practices
Shrimp and dried fish are emblematic of Bangladeshi cuisine. However, according to a 2014 Bureau of International Labor Affairs report, they also rank among the goods that are produced by child labour and forced labour in Bangladesh. The US Department of Labor also reported that "some children work under forced labor conditions in the dried fishing sector to help their families pay off debts to local moneylenders".
Classified as "aquacultural goods" in the Public Library of US Diplomacy's TVPRA Response on the production of goods under child labour conditions in Bangladesh, the Government of Bangladesh recognises that "some of the worst forms of child labor may exist in the rural sector (e.g. fish drying) and has been working with the ILO and other donors to craft an appropriate development program response."

See also
List of fish in Bangladesh
Agriculture in Bangladesh

References

External links

 
Economy of Bangladesh